Sutton Town A.F.C. was a football club based in Sutton-in-Ashfield, Nottinghamshire, England.  The previous club was a member of the Northern Counties East League Premier Division until 2007 when they resigned, but the new club joined the Central Midlands League Premier Division, three levels lower in the English football league system, and later played in the East Midlands Counties League. The team was reformed in 2020, and was initially accepted into the Notts Senior league, but they never started the seasons fixtures.  They then began playing friendlies in Spring 2021 ahead of again joining the Notts Senior League.  They played against Nottinghamshire, Nuthall AFC, Trent Vineyard and Rushcliffe Reserves although the results were not made public.

History

Previous club
A previous club called Sutton Town existed until 1997. They played in the Northern Counties East League. They also spent time in the Midland Football League and the Northern Premier League. They were regular competitors in the Nottinghamshire Senior Cup. They still hold the joint record for most cup wins, along with Nottingham Forest. They were based at Priestsic Road in Sutton-in-Ashfield. Following the loss of the ground for the building of a supermarket, they moved to Lowmoor Road in the neighbouring town of Kirkby-in-Ashfield. They changed their name to Ashfield United because of a sponsorship deal with Ashfield District Council, however the club folded in 1997. This club was also nicknamed The Snipes. 

Another now defunct club (1996), Oakham United, based close to the King's Mill Hospital on the boundary between Sutton and Mansfield, applied to change their name to Sutton Town when the previous club became defunct but were denied permission by the Nottinghamshire FA.

2007 club
This incarnation of the club was formed in August 2007, to replace an older club, previously known as North Notts F.C., who disbanded. In 2013 they were promoted to the East Midlands Counties League as champions of the Central Midlands League South Division. In June 2014 the club resigned from the league after they were unable to come to a suitable agreement over a lease at home ground The Fieldings that would enable them to be promoted in the future, which is a league requirement. They now had the option of trying to join another league which would allow them to continue at the same ground, but the problem remained that the Snipes would not be eligible for promotion under the terms of their current lease.

Honours
Northern Counties East League Division One
Champions 2004–05
Central Midlands League Supreme Division
Runners-up 2002–03, 2009–10
Central Midlands League Premier Division
Champions 2000–01

As reformed club

Central Midlands League South Division
Champions 2012–13
Nottinghamshire Senior Cup
Runners – up 2012–13

Central Midlands League Cup Winners 2008/09
(Manager – D. Bryant)

Central Midlands Floodlit Cup Runners-up 2008/09
(Manager – D. Bryant)

Records
FA Cup
First Qualifying Round 2003–04, 2004–05
FA Vase
Second Round 2004–05, 2006–07

References

General references

External links
Official Site

Association football clubs established in 2007
2007 establishments in England
Association football clubs disestablished in 2014
2014 disestablishments in England
Defunct football clubs in Nottinghamshire
Central Midlands Football League
East Midlands Counties Football League
Sutton-in-Ashfield